Nagia evanescens is a species of moth in the family Erebidae. It is found in Nigeria.

References

Endemic fauna of Nigeria
Nagia
Moths described in 1926
Moths of Africa